The 2007 UIM F1 World Championship was the 24th season of Formula 1 Powerboat racing. The calendar consisted of eight events, beginning in Portimao, Portugal on 13 May 2007, and ending in Sharjah, UAE on 14 December 2007. Sami Seliö, driving for F1 Team Energy, secured his maiden drivers' title, the first driver outside of Italy, the US and the UK to do so.

Teams and drivers

Season calendar

Results and standings
Points were awarded to the top 10 classified finishers. A maximum of two boats per team were eligible for points in the teams' championship.

Drivers standings

Teams standings
Only boats with results eligible for points counting towards the teams' championship are shown here.

References

External links
 The official website of the UIM F1 H2O World Championship
 The official website of the Union Internationale Motonautique

F1 Powerboat World Championship
Formula 1 Powerboat seasons
F1 Powerboat World Championship